Gustaf Valfrid Teodor Gösta Bergström (6 August 1903 – 10 October 1988) was a Swedish long-distance runner. He competed in the men's 10,000 metres and cross country running at the 1924 Summer Olympics.

References

External links
 

1903 births
1988 deaths
Athletes (track and field) at the 1924 Summer Olympics
Swedish male long-distance runners
Olympic athletes of Sweden
Place of birth missing
Olympic cross country runners